The Roma Sevens International Rugby Sevens Tournament is held every years since 2002 in Rome, Italy, at the Stadio dei Marmi.

Men's tournament
Participants in the Roma Sevens over the years: Australia national rugby sevens team, South Africa national rugby sevens team, Kenya national rugby sevens team, France national rugby sevens team, Argentina national rugby sevens team, Spain national rugby sevens team, Italy national rugby sevens team, Georgia national rugby sevens team, Netherlands national rugby union team (sevens), Ukraine national rugby union team, Army Rugby Union, Yug Rugby, Atlantis Sevens, Golden Lions, Stellenbosh University, Melrose RFC, Froggies, Samurai International R.F.C., Penguins R.F.C., Marauders R.F.C., Belgium Barbarians

Gold Book

Women's tournament

The women's tournament has been played since 2009.

2009
5 & 6 June 2009
The tournament was won by Samurai Ladies International (UK). Other participants were: Wooden Spoon, The Bassets Ladies, Murrayfields Wanderers RFC. No match results are available

2010
3–4 June
Pool 1

 41-0 
 0-24 
 14-17 

Semi-finals: 
 12-7 
 22-7 
Bowl final: 
 0-25 
Pool 2

 47-0 
 0-26 
 17-7 

Plate final: 
 7-14 
Final: 
 19-5

2011
3–4 June
Pool 1

 17-12 Kusa
 10-19 
 14-10 Kusa
 12-17 
 0-31 Kusa
 0-24 

Bowl Semi-finals: 
 24-0 
 15-5 
Bowl final: 
 17-5 
Pool 2

 35-7 
 28-0 
 26-0 
 10-14 
 29-12 
 27-7 

Semi-finals: 
 14-15 
 7-12 Kusa

Final: 
 12-10 Kusa

2012
18–19 May
Pool 1

 14-21 
 34-0 
 10-14 
 28-0 
 14-10 
 0-52 

Bowl Semi-finals: 
 45-0 
 21-0 
Bowl final: 
 12-17 
Pool 2

 22-0 
 w/o 
 5-10 
 0-65 
 7-12 
 0-32 

Semi-finals: 
 38-5 
 34-0 
Third place
 22-0 
Final: 
 24-21

Notable players of the tournament

Waisale Serevi
Ben Gollings
DJ Forbes
Cecil Afrika
Ollie Phillips
Afeleke Pelenise
Tomasi Cama
Collins Injera
Solomon King
Chester Williams
William Ryder
Fritz Lee
Apolosi Satala
Justin Wilson
Howard Graham
Sherwin Stowers
Lepani Nabuliwaqa
John Rudd (rugby union)
Rob Thirlby
Renfred Dazel
Tim Walsh (rugby union)
Will Matthews (rugby union)
Kyle Brown
Mirco Bergamasco
Mark Lee

References

External links
 Official Tournaments website

Rugby sevens competitions in Europe
Women's rugby sevens competitions
Women's sports competitions in Italy